Mid Valley Megamall is a shopping mall in Mid Valley City, Kuala Lumpur, Malaysia. It sits at the entrance of Petaling Jaya and Kuala Lumpur. Developed by IGB Berhad, the complex was opened in 1999. The mall has garnered media attention with events like the IT Fair, Home and Decoration Fair,  and The MATTA Fair being held in the Exhibition Center. It was awarded Best Shopping Complex Award 2000 by Tourism Malaysia and Best Retail Development 2001 by FIABCI Malaysia.

It was announced that a second Mid Valley Southkey Megamall had been slated for 2016 in the Iskandar region of Johor Bahru.

Incidents
On 30 May 2017, a fire broke out on Megamall's second floor at 8:20 pm local time. The Malaysian Fire and Rescue Department managed to put it out by 8:52 pm. A subsequent investigation traced the cause of the fire to a faulty facsimile machine.

Building 
It comprises a shopping mall, an office tower block, 30 offices, and three hotels. A second mall, The Gardens Mall, is adjacent to the Megamall. This whole area is sometimes referred to Mid Valley City.

It houses a  convention centre and it is adjacent to a 646-room business hotel named Cititel Midvalley. A further two hotels are in the same area: The Boulevard Hotel, The Gardens Hotel and Residences. There has been a proposal to link Mid Valley Megamall and Masjid Jamek via a  bicycle lane.

Mid Valley Southkey 
Mid Valley Southkey Mall, located in Johor Bahru, Johor, is the second Mid Valley branded shopping centre and opened on 23 April 2019. It is one of the newest and most visited malls in the city.

Transportation

Train
The mall is connected to the  Mid Valley Station of Keretapi Tanah Melayu.

The mall is also located within walking distance from the   Abdullah Hukum station. However, for many years, there was no proper connection between the station and the mall. With the completion of the Abdullah Hukum KTM Komuter station, a dedicated pedestrian bridge has been constructed to link The Gardens Mall and the station through KL Eco City.

Bus
Free shuttle bus service provided by the mall is available to and from  Bank Rakyat-Bangsar LRT station, as well as Rapid KL Bus T788 which travels to and from the  KL Gateway–Universiti station and MRT feeder bus T817 which travels to and from the  Pavilion Damansara Heights–Pusat Bandar Damansara station.

Gallery

See also

 List of shopping malls in Malaysia

References

Shopping malls in Kuala Lumpur
Shopping malls established in 1999
1999 establishments in Malaysia
20th-century architecture in Malaysia